No Return may refer to:

 No Return (1973 film), a Soviet film
 No Return (2010 film), a Spanish-Argentine thriller drama film
 "No Return" (XxxHolic: Kei), a 2008 television episode
 "No Return", a 2008 song by God Is an Astronaut from their self-titled album
 "No Return", a 2021 song by Polo G from Hall of Fame

See also